Civic Center Historic District may refer to:
 Berkeley Historic Civic Center District, a National Register of Historic Places listings in Alameda County, California
 Columbus Civic Center Historic District in Columbus, Ohio
 San Francisco Civic Center Historic District, in San Francisco, California
 Pasadena Civic Center District, in Pasadena, California
 Civic Center Historic District (Denver, Colorado), a National Register of Historic Places listing in downtown Denver
 Lihue Civic Center Historic District, Lihue, Hawaii
 Wailuku Civic Center Historic District, Wailuku, Hawaii
 Civic Center Historic District (Des Moines, Iowa)
 Peabody Civic Center Historic District, Peabody, Massachusetts
 Duluth Civic Center Historic District, Duluth, Minnesota
 Griswold Civic Center Historic District, Allegan, Michigan
 Warwick Civic Center Historic District, Warwick, Rhode Island
 Longview Civic Center Historic District, a National Register of Historic Places listing in Cowlitz County, Washington
 Civic Center Historic District (Kenosha, Wisconsin)

See also
 Civic Center